Vichten is a commune and small town in central Luxembourg, in the canton of Redange.

, the town of Vichten, which lies in the west of the commune, has a population of 723.  Other towns within the commune include Michelbouch.

The town is notable as the site of a large Roman villa containing a large and well-preserved mosaic. The mosaic itself is on display at the National Museum of History and Art in Luxembourg City. A replica can be seen in Vichten itself.

Population

References

External links
 

 
Communes in Redange (canton)
Towns in Luxembourg